Buesa is a surname. Notable people with the surname include:

Fernando Buesa (1946–2000), Spanish politician
 Manuel Artime Buesa (1932–1977), Cuban-American soldier and political leader
Martín Buesa (born 1988), Spanish basketball player

See also
Broto#Villages